Darvasiceras was a prolecanitid ammonoid cephalopod from the Early or Lower Permian Chelamchin Formation of Tajikistan. The genus is included in what is now the superfamily Medlicottioidea. The type species is Darvisciceras minum.

The shell of Darvasiceras is discoidal, moderately involute in adult stages; the venter narrow, smooth, and flat; the umbilicus shallow and small. The external portion of the suture consists of a small ventral and five umbilical lobes (per side). Lobes are weakly developed, are neither deep nor wide, and are separated by extremely wide, rounded saddles. The first two umbilical lobes are bifid, prongs being weakly developed.

References
Notes

Web links
 Genus Darvaciceras in GONIAT online

Permian ammonites
Cephalopod genera
Fossils of Tajikistan